48 ore is a television series produced in Italy in 2006 by Mediaset.  The program was first broadcast during primetime television on 8 March 2006 on Canale 5 where it received negative ratings.  It was moved to Italia 1 for the next summer.  The drama is now repeated on the pay channel Joi and sometimes late at night on Italia 1.

Synopsis 
The series tells the story of a group of police officers from the police station of Genoa, that belong to the Flying Squad, whose job it is to capture the fugitives.

48 hours represent the time limit beyond which a fugitive's tracks are likely to be lost.  In order to operate in such a short amount of time agents are sourced with the most diverse skills as possible.

See also
List of Italian television series

External links
 

2006 Italian television series debuts
Canale 5 original programming
Italia 1 original programming